James Paronto (born April 25, 1943) is a former baseball and American football player, coach, and official.  He served at the head football coach at Adams State College—now known as Adams State University—from 1977 to 1980 and at Mesa State College—now known as Colorado Mesa University—from 1990 to 1993, compiling a career college football coaching record of 41–43.  He is the father of Kris Paronto.

Playing career
Paronto played quarterback at Adams State, graduating in 1966 and serving as team captain in 1965.  He earned accolades of Academic All-Conference, Second Team Academic All-American, and Second Team All-Conference.  While at Adams State, he also played on the school's baseball team.

Coaching career
Paronto was the 14th head football coach at Adams State College—now known as Adams State University—in Alamosa, Colorado and he held that position for four seasons, from 1977 until 1980.  His coaching record at Adams State was 22–19.  At Adams State, he was named NAIA District Coach of the Year in 1974.  He later became the head coach of the Colorado Mesa Mavericks football program from 1990 to 1993.  While at Mesa, his teams accumulated a record of 19 wins and 24 losses and won their conference championship in 1990.

Paronto also coached as an assistant at Brigham Young University (BYU) and Oregon State

Sports administration and officiating
In July 2003, Paronto was named the coordinator of baseball umpires for the Mountain West Conference.  In addition to his baseball officiating, Paronto worked in the Western Athletic Conference as a basketball official and was selected in 1982 as an alternate in a regional postseason game.  He also was Secretary Rules Editor for the NCAA Baseball Rules Committee (2003–2015) and officiated baseball for over 40 years.  He worked the National Junior College World Series 15 times took various on-field assignments in several conference championships.

Head coaching record

Football

References

1943 births
Living people
American football quarterbacks
Basketball referees
Adams State Grizzlies baseball coaches
Adams State Grizzlies baseball players
Adams State Grizzlies football coaches
Adams State Grizzlies football players
BYU Cougars football coaches
Colorado Mesa Mavericks football coaches
Oregon State Beavers football coaches